Sinking Spring is an upcoming drama television series.

Premise
Two friends who pose as DEA agents to rob a house faces the consequences of their actions when it turns out they robbed a large narcotics operation.

Cast
 Brian Tyree Henry as Ray
 Wagner Moura as Manny Cespedes
 Marin Ireland as Kristy Lynne
 Kate Mulgrew as Theresa Bowers
 Amir Arison as Mark Nader
 Ving Rhames as Bart
 Dustin Nguyen as Ho Dinh
 Nesta Cooper as Michelle
 Idris Debrand as Young Ray
 Liz Caribel as Sherry
 Will Pullen as Marchetti

Production
It was announced in August 2022 that Apple TV+ was nearing a series order, with Brian Tyree Henry starring. Ridley Scott will direct an episode in addition to executive producing. The cast, including Michael Mando, Marin Ireland and Kate Mulgrew, were announced the following months. In January 2023, Amir Arison was cast, with Ving Rhames, Dustin Nguyen and Nesta Cooper among additional castings the following month.

Filming on the series began in February 2023 in Philadelphia. Following an onset altercation with another actor, Mando was fired from the production, with Wagner Moura cast to replace him.

References

External links
Sinking Spring at the Internet Movie Database

Apple TV+ original programming
American drama television series
Television series by Scott Free Productions